A Cause to Kill or Sha Ji is a 1970 Hong Kong Shaw Brothers  thriller film directed by Murayama Mitsuo.

Cast
 Chiao Chiao - Su Su.
Gwan Gam
Wai Ha
Pak-Kwong Ho
Chung-Shun Huang
 Shan Kwan - Chang Li De.
 Ivy Ling Po - Sin Lei.
Choh Lam Tsang

References

External links
 

1970 films
Hong Kong thriller films
1970s thriller films
Shaw Brothers Studio films
1970s Hong Kong films